{{Infobox settlement
| name                            = Ghangaria
| native_name                     = 
| native_name_lang                = 
| other_name                      = 
| nickname                        = 
| settlement_type                 = village
| image_skyline                   = Gangharia.jpg
| image_caption                   = 
| pushpin_map                     = India Uttarakhand#India
| pushpin_label_position          = right
| pushpin_map_caption             = Location in Uttarakhand, India
| coordinates                     = 
| subdivision_type                = Country
| subdivision_name                = 
| subdivision_type1               = State
| subdivision_name1               = Uttarakhand
| established_title               = 
| established_date                = 
| founder                         = 
| named_for                       = 
| government_type                 = 
| governing_body                  = 
| unit_pref                       = Metric
| area_footnotes                  = 
| area_rank                       = 
| area_total_km2                  = 
| elevation_footnotes             = 
| elevation_m                     = 3049
| population_total                = 
| population_as_of                = 
| population_rank                 = 
| population_density_km2          = auto
| population_demonym              = 
| population_footnotes            = 
| demographics_type1              = Languages
| demographics1_title1            = Official
| demographics1_info1             = Garhwali
| timezone1                       = IST
| utc_offset1                     = +5:30
| postal_code_type                = 
| postal_code                     = 
| registration_plate              = UK 11
| website                         = 
}}Ghangaria''' is a small village on the way to Hemkund Sahib, a popular pilgrimage site for Sikhs which is about 6 km from  here and the Valley of Flowers, a national park known for its variety of flowers about 5 km from here. It is located in the northern Himalayan ranges at an altitude of 3049 meters in Uttarakhand state of India.

Ghangaria is situated at the confluence of the rivers Bhyundar Ganga and Pushpawati, which forms Lakshman Ganga, that later meets the river Alaknanda at Govindghat. It is the last human habitation in the Bhyundar valley. This place is usually used by travelers as a base camp to visit Hemkund and Valley of flowers.  It is only open from May till September. The rest of the year, the valley is covered under snow.

Ghangaria can be reached after a trek of less than 11 km. Shared taxis are available up to 4 km from Govindghat.  Ghangaria has a helipad. One can also hire a porter or mule or a helicopter to avoid this strenuous trekking. There is no clear road, only a path made of rocks. Latest track is good for walking. A walking bamboo stick will be helpful, available in Gobindghat for only 20-30inr. Ghangaria has various hotels including one from the GMVN (Garhwal Mandal Vikas Nigam), restaurants serving Punjabi, Chinese, Garhwali dishes, shops, camping grounds and a big Gurdwara to accommodate pilgrims. Other than this few more hotels are available now. Services are better than GMVN. Earlier only satellite telephone service was available, with only one outgoing call allowed for the entire village at any given time, but now you get weak signal of BSNL, but not Jio or Airtel. Going up for 600 meters take left for Valley of flowers after having ticket. Straight up is way to Hemkund Sahib.

Recent floods in the area
Flooding in Uttarakhand on 16 June 2013 affected the accessibility of Ghangaria. Ghangaria village is accessible now.

See also
 Valley of flowers.  Full information about valley of flowers
Pushpawati River
Lakshman Ganga River
Valley of Flowers
Gobindghat
 Valley of flowers.  Ghangaria is the base camp for valley of flowers trek.
 Valley of flowers.  Most informative site for valley of flowers trek.

References

External links

Tourism in Uttarakhand
Villages in Chamoli district